In probability theory, the law of total variance or variance decomposition formula or conditional variance formulas or law of iterated variances also known as Eve's law, states that if  and  are random variables on the same probability space, and the variance of  is finite, then

In language perhaps better known to statisticians than to probability theorists, the two terms are the "unexplained" and the "explained" components of the variance respectively (cf. fraction of variance unexplained, explained variation). In actuarial science, specifically credibility theory, the first component is called the expected value of the process variance (EVPV) and the second is called the variance of the hypothetical means (VHM). These two components are also the source of the term "Eve's law", from the initials EV VE for "expectation of variance" and "variance of expectation".

Formulation

There is a general variance decomposition formula for  components (see below). For example, with two conditioning random variables:

which follows from the law of total conditional variance:

If we write  then the random variable  is just  Similar comments apply to the conditional variance.

One special case, (similar to the law of total expectation) states that if  is a partition of the whole outcome space, that is, these events are mutually exclusive and exhaustive, then

In this formula, the first component is the expectation of the conditional variance;  the other two components are the variance of the conditional expectation.

Proof

The law of total variance can be proved using the law of total expectation. First,

from the definition of variance.  Again, from the definition of variance, and applying the law of total expectation, we have

Since the expectation of a sum is the sum of expectations, the terms can now be regrouped:

Finally, we recognize the terms in the second set of parentheses as the variance of the conditional expectation :

General variance decomposition applicable to dynamic systems

The following formula shows how to apply the general, measure theoretic variance decomposition formula  to stochastic dynamic systems. Let  be the value of a system variable at time  Suppose we have the internal histories (natural filtrations) , each one corresponding to the history (trajectory) of a different collection of system variables. The collections need not be disjoint. The variance of  can be decomposed, for all times  into  components as follows:

The decomposition is not unique. It depends on the order of the conditioning in the sequential decomposition.

The square of the correlation and explained (or informational) variation

In cases where  are such that the conditional expected value is linear; that is, in cases where

it follows from the bilinearity of covariance that  

and

One example of this situation is when  have a bivariate normal (Gaussian) distribution.

More generally, when the conditional expectation  is a non-linear function of 

Higher moments

A similar law for the third central moment  says

For higher cumulants, a generalization exists.  See law of total cumulance.

See also

  − a generalization

References

 
  (Problem 34.10(b))

Algebra of random variables
Statistical deviation and dispersion
Articles containing proofs
Theory of probability distributions
Theorems in statistics
Statistical laws